Generations is the twelfth studio album by the American rock band Journey. It was the band's last album with lead singer Steve Augeri and second album with drummer Deen Castronovo, confirming the line-up of 2000's Arrival and 2002's Red 13 EP. The album was given away for free by the band during most of the concerts of the Generations Tour in 2005, and subsequently released on Sanctuary Records later the same year.

This was the first Journey album where all of the band members share lead vocal duties, which Augeri later admitted in 2022 was due to his voice suffering from fatigue at the time. Jonathan Cain sings lead on "Every Generation" and "Pride of the Family" (the latter of which is only found on the Japanese edition), the first time he sang lead since "All That Really Matters" (originally a Frontiers outtake) from the Time3 box set. Deen Castronovo sings lead on "A Better Life" and "Never Too Late". Neal Schon provides lead vocals for "In Self Defense" (previously recorded for the Schon & Hammer album Here to Stay) and Ross Valory lends his vocals to "Gone Crazy".

Critical reception was mixed upon the album's release; Most critics praised Augeri's vocal performance and the band's more diverse musical direction compared to previous albums, but many were divided on the band's decision to share lead vocals.

The album peaked at No. 170 on the Billboard 200 album chart. Generations was the last album to feature Augeri, who left the band mid-tour in 2006 due to a throat infection. Jeff Scott Soto replaced him and toured with the band until June 2007. It was also the only Journey album released by the now-defunct Sanctuary Records.

The latter portion of the song "Faith in the Heartland" was heard during the December 10, 2006 edition of NBC's Football Night in America, during a segment about Dallas Cowboys quarterback Tony Romo. "Faith in the Heartland" and "The Place in Your Heart" were re-recorded by the band with new vocalist Arnel Pineda on their 2008 album Revelation, but "The Place in Your Heart" was only released as a bonus track on the Japanese edition of that album.

Track listing

Personnel
Band members
 Steve Augeri - lead vocals (unless otherwise noted), additional guitar on "Butterfly (She Flies Alone)" and "Believe"
 Neal Schon - lead guitar, backing vocals, lead vocals on "In Self-Defense"
 Jonathan Cain - keyboards, rhythm guitar, backing vocals, lead vocals on "Every Generation" and "Pride of the Family"
 Ross Valory - bass, backing vocals, lead vocals on "Gone Crazy"
 Deen Castronovo - drums, percussion, backing vocals, lead vocals on "A Better Life" and "Never Too Late"

Production
Kevin Elson - producer
Mike Fraser - engineer, mixing at The Warehouse Studio, Vancouver, B.C. 
Tom Size, Bill Donnelly - engineers
Stephen Marcussen - mastering

Charts

References

2005 albums
Journey (band) albums
Sanctuary Records albums
Albums produced by Kevin Elson
Frontiers Records albums
King Records (Japan) albums
Kakao M albums